Lupo di Francesco (14th century) was an Italian sculptor and architect, active in Pisa.

He collaborated with Giovanni Pisani in the sculpting of the pulpit of the Cathedral of Pisa, later was a pupil of Tino di Camaino. In 1315, he worked as architect of the Cathedral of Pisa. He was active in 1325.

References

14th-century Italian architects
Italian sculptors
Italian male sculptors
Year of birth unknown
Year of death unknown
People from Siena